The 2012 Kansas State Wildcats football team represented Kansas State University in the 2012 NCAA Division I FBS football season.  The Wildcats played their home games at Bill Snyder Family Football Stadium in Manhattan, Kansas, as they have done since 1968. 2012 marked the 117th season in school history. The Wildcats were led by head coach Bill Snyder in his 21st overall and fourth straight season since taking over for his second tenure in 2009. K-State competed as a member of the Big 12 Conference. Conference play began with an upset victory over the Oklahoma Sooners, which was the first win for the Wildcats in Norman since October 25, 1997.

The Wildcats started the season with an undefeated 10–0 record, and were ranked as the #1 team in country after a Week 10 defeat of TCU. However, the Wildcats' undefeated season and #1 ranking were derailed one week later after they were soundly defeated by upstart Baylor. The regular conference season came to a close with a fifth straight win over the Texas Longhorns, ending with an 8–1 record to clinch a share of Big 12 title with Oklahoma. Both teams made the postseason for the first time since the 2003 Big 12 Championship Game. Kansas State finished the regular season as the #5 ranked team and were invited to the Fiesta Bowl for the third time, where they were defeated by Oregon. The Wildcats suffered their second consecutive Fiesta Bowl loss since 2003 in the 2004 Fiesta Bowl, ending the season with an 11–2 record and were ranked #11 in the final polls.

Off-season
The 2011 Wildcats finished the season with a 10–3 record overall, 7–2 in Big-12 play, behind Oklahoma State. They were invited to the Cotton Bowl Classic, where they were defeated by the Arkansas Razorbacks, making it the first Cotton Bowl Classic loss for the Wildcats since the 1996 team lost to the BYU Cougars in the 1997 Cotton Bowl Classic.

In mid-August, incoming freshman quarterback Tavarious Bender decided to leave the team and the university for undisclosed reasons.

Schedule

Game summaries

Missouri State

The Wildcats were favored by 34 going into the game.

Miami

Kansas State was favored by 7 going into the game.

North Texas

Kansas State was favored by 28½ going into the game.

Sources:

For their next road game, the Mean Green played the Kansas State Wildcats, led by potential Heisman Trophy candidate Collin Klein. The two teams had last met during the 2010 season, when the Wildcats defeated the Mean Green 41–49 in the final game at Fouts Field. This time playing at Bill Snyder Family Football Stadium, the Wildcats were favored to win by 28 points by spread bettors prior to the game. Each team scored two touchdowns by midway through the third quarter, but a blocked extra point attempt after North Texas' second score made the score 14-13. Kansas State answered with three unanswered touchdowns in the third and fourth quarter, bringing the score to 35-13 before North Texas scored its final touchdown with 2:31 left in the game. The final score was 35-13 in favor of the Wildcats. Mean Green quarterback Derek Thompson completed 25 of 28 passes in the game.

Oklahoma
Oklahoma was favored by 14 going into the game.

Kansas

Kansas State was favored by 24 going into the game.

Iowa State

Kansas State was favored by 7 going into the game.

West Virginia

West Virginia was favored by 2.5 going into the game.  The game was hyped as a matchup between Heisman Trophy hopefuls Geno Smith from West Virginia and Collin Klein from Kansas State.  Kansas State took an early lead and had the score at 52–7 with 2:25 left in the third quarter.  The final score was a Kansas State victory 55–14.

After the conclusion of the season, ESPN sportswriter David Ubben named this the fifth best game of the Big 12 Conference for the season.

Texas Tech

Kansas State was favored by 7 going into the game.

Oklahoma State

Kansas State was favored by 8.5 points going into the game.

TCU

Kansas State was favored by 7 points heading to the game.

Baylor

Kansas State was favored by 11 points going into the game.

Sources:

One week after falling in Norman, and almost a year to the day after the Bears' BCS-shaking first victory against Oklahoma, the Bears again took on a top 5 opponent in Waco.  This time the opponent was 10–0 Kansas State, ranked #1 in the BCS after an Alabama loss the previous week and clear favorites in their final two games of the year, at Baylor and vs. Texas.  As so often during the season, the quick-strike Baylor offense put the Bears ahead early on a 38-yard Florence pass to Tevin Reese.  Kansas State answered when then-Heisman favorite Collin Klein completed a touchdown pass to tie the game 7–7.  Baylor subsequently put up 21 unanswered points to go ahead 28–7 before the Wildcats managed 10 more points in the final two minutes of the first half.  In the third quarter, Baylor put up another touchdown (a 4-yard Glasco Martin IV rush) and forced a Kansas State punt that pinned Baylor on their own 1-yard line.  Two plays later, Florence attempted a quick pass to Terrance Williams that was intercepted on the 2-yard line, setting up a Collin Klein touchdown rush that made the score 35–24 in Baylor's favor.  The Bears went on to rack up 17 more points in the third quarter, the last touchdown coming on an 80-yard Lache Seastrunk rush after Joe Williams intercepted Klein in the endzone (the third of Klein's three interceptions on the night).  With 58 seconds remaining in the third quarter following Seastrunk's touchdown, Kansas State embarked upon an 8-minute, 21 play, 74-yard drive that brought the Wildcats to first-and-goal from the Baylor 6-yard line.  An inspired Baylor defense turned in the goal-line stand of their season, halting four straight Collin Klein rushes and forcing a turnover on downs.  Baylor would subsequently almost completely run down the clock, picking up 4 first downs on 10 straight rushes before punting the ball back to Kansas State with only 32 seconds left in the game.  The victory was Baylor's first ever over a #1 ranked opponent (the 1956 team defeated #2 Tennessee in the 1957 Sugar Bowl, and the 1941 team tied #1 Texas) and represented only the fifth time in the BCS era that the #1 ranked team lost to an unranked opponent.  The win took Baylor to 5–5 on the season, needing one more victory for bowl eligibility.

Texas

Kansas State was favored by 10.5 points heading to the game.

2013 Fiesta Bowl (vs. Oregon)

Oregon was favored by 9 points going to the game.

Rankings

Roster

Coaching staff
The following is a list of coaches at Kansas State for the 2012 season.

References

Kansas State
Kansas State Wildcats football seasons
Big 12 Conference football champion seasons
Kansas State Wildcats football